Pleasant Hill Historic District may refer to:

Pleasant Hill Historic District (Macon, Georgia), listed on the NRHP in Georgia
Pleasant Hill, Kentucky, also known as Shakertown at Pleasant Hill Historic District, Shakertown and vicinity, KY, listed on the NRHP in Kentucky
Pleasant Hill Downtown Historic District, Pleasant Hill, MO, listed on the NRHP in Missouri
Pleasant Hill Residential Historic District, Marshfield, WI, listed on the NRHP in Wisconsin